Glassboro is a borough in Gloucester County, in the U.S. state of New Jersey. As of the 2020 United States census, the borough's population was 23,149, an increase of 4,570 (+24.6%) from the 2010 census count of 18,579, which in turn reflected a decline of 489 (−2.6%) from the 19,068 counted in the 2000 census.

What is now Glassboro was originally formed as a township by an act of the New Jersey Legislature on March 11, 1878, from portions of Clayton Township. Portions of the township were taken to form Elk Township (April 17, 1891) and Pitman (May 24, 1905). Glassboro was incorporated as a borough on March 18, 1920, replacing Glassboro Township. The borough was named for its glass industry.

Glassboro is home to Rowan University, founded in 1923 and formerly known as Glassboro State College, which was the site of the Glassboro Summit Conference in 1967 between U.S. President Lyndon B. Johnson and Soviet Premier Alexei Kosygin.

Glassboro is part of the South Jersey region of the state.

History

Glassboro's early industrial history was built on the manufacturing of glass. The town was first established in 1779 by Solomon Stanger as Glass Works in the Woods. Glass manufacturers over the years since include Heston-Carpenter Glass Works, Olive Glass Works, Harmony Glass Works, Temperanceville Glass Works, Whitney Brothers Glass Works, Owens Bottle Company, Owens Illinois Glass Company, and Anchor Hocking.

In 1958, a typhoid fever epidemic broke out in the predominantly African-American neighborhoods of Elsmere and Lawns, which was attributed to 20 years of municipal neglect of the sanitary infrastructure in these neighborhoods.

The Glassboro Summit Conference between U.S. President Lyndon B. Johnson and Soviet Premier Alexei Kosygin took place in Glassboro. Johnson and Kosygin met for three days from June 23 to June 25, 1967, at Glassboro State College (later renamed Rowan University). The location was chosen as a compromise. Kosygin, having agreed to address the United Nations in New York City, wanted to meet in New York City. Johnson, wary of encountering protests against the Vietnam War, preferred to meet in Washington, D.C. They agreed in Glassboro because it was equidistant between the two cities. The summit's generally amicable atmosphere was referred to as the "Spirit of Glassboro," although the leaders failed to reach agreement on limiting anti-ballistic missile systems.

On June 19, 1986, Ronald Reagan became the first sitting president to speak at a high school graduation when he spoke at the Glassboro High School commencement ceremonies.

Geography
According to the U.S. Census Bureau, the borough had a total area of 9.36 square miles (24.24 km2), including 9.32 square miles (24.14 km2) of land and 0.04 square miles (0.10 km2) of water (0.41%). Unincorporated communities, localities and place names located partially or completely within the borough include Elsemere.

Glassboro borders the Gloucester County municipalities of Clayton Borough, Elk Township, Harrison Township, Mantua Township, Monroe Township, Pitman, and Washington Township.

Climate
The area is characterized by hot, humid summers and generally mild to cool winters. According to the Köppen Climate Classification system, Glassboro has a humid subtropical climate, abbreviated "Cfa" on climate maps.

Demographics

2010 census

The Census Bureau's 2006–2010 American Community Survey showed that (in 2010 inflation-adjusted dollars) median household income was $54,795 (with a margin of error of +/− $3,793) and the median family income was $67,171 (+/− $9,496). Males had a median income of $49,695 (+/− $4,361) versus $43,489 (+/− $2,608) for females. The per capita income for the borough was $23,108 (+/− $1,421). About 9.3% of families and 14.5% of the population were below the poverty line, including 18.6% of those under age 18 and 5.0% of those age 65 or over.

2000 census
As of the 2000 census, there were 19,068 people, 6,225 households, and 4,046 families residing in the borough. The racial makeup of the borough was 74.5% White, 19.5% African American, 0.2% Native American, 2.3% Asian, 0.1% Pacific Islander, 1.5% from other races, and 2.0% from two or more races. Hispanic or Latino of any race were 3.8% of the population.

There were 6,225 households, out of which 32.5% had children under the age of 18 living with them, 46.3% were married couples living together, 14.6% had a female householder with no husband present, and 35.0% were non-families. 23.6% of all households were made up of individuals, and 8.4% had someone living alone who was 65 years of age or older. The average household size was 2.66 and the average family size was 3.17.

In the borough, the population was spread out, with 22.1% under the age of 18, 25.6% from 18 to 24, 25.9% from 25 to 44, 16.6% from 45 to 64, and 9.8% who were 65 years of age or older. The median age was 27 years. For every 100 females, there were 91.8 males. For every 100 females age 18 and over, there were 89.3 males.

The median income for a household in the borough was $44,992, and the median income for a family was $55,246. Males had a median income of $40,139 versus $30,358 for females. The per capita income for the borough was $18,113. About 8.5% of families and 15.2% of the population were below the poverty line, including 15.6% of those under age 18 and 7.9% of those age 65 or over.

Parks and recreation
The Glassboro Wildlife Management Area covers almost  in portions of Glassboro, Clayton, and Monroe Township.

Government

Local government 
Glassboro is governed under the Borough form of New Jersey municipal government, which is used in 218 municipalities (of the 564) statewide, making it the most common form of government in New Jersey. The governing body is comprised of the Mayor and the Borough Council, with all positions elected at-large on a partisan basis as part of the November general election. The Mayor is elected directly by the voters to a four-year term of office. The Borough Council is comprised of six members elected to serve three-year terms on a staggered basis, with two seats coming up for election each year in a three-year cycle. The Borough form of government used by Glassboro is a "weak mayor / strong council" government in which council members act as the legislative body with the mayor presiding at meetings and voting only in the event of a tie. The mayor can veto ordinances subject to an override by a two-thirds majority vote of the council. The mayor makes committee and liaison assignments for council members, and most appointments are made by the mayor with the advice and consent of the council.

Anna Miller was appointed by the borough council in March 2013 from among three candidates offered by the municipal Democratic committee to fill the vacant seat of George Cossabone.

In March 2019, Danielle Spence was selected to fill the seat on the Borough Council expiring in December 2019 that had been held by Edward A. Malandro. Spence served on an interim basis until the November 2019 general election, when she was elected to serve the balance of the term of office and won a full three-year term, while Anthony J. Fiola was elected to serve an unexpired term.

, the Mayor of Glassboro is Democrat John E. Wallace, whose term of office ends December 31, 2026. Members of the Borough Council, and the years their terms expire, are Council President Anna Miller (D, 2024), George P. Cossabone Sr. (D, 2025), Joseph M. D'Alessandro (D, 2023), Anthony J. Fiola (D, 2023), Andrew Halter (D, 2024), and Daniele Brida Spence (D, 2025).

Federal, state, and county representation 
Glassboro is located in the 1st Congressional District and is part of New Jersey's 3rd state legislative district. Prior to the 2011 reapportionment following the 2010 Census, Glassboro had been in the 4th state legislative district.

Politics
As of March 2011, there were a total of 9,772 registered voters in Glassboro, of which 3,733 (38.2%) were registered as Democrats, 1,408 (14.4%) were registered as Republicans and 4,617 (47.2%) were registered as Unaffiliated. There were 14 voters registered as Libertarians or Greens.

In the 2020 presidential election, Democrat Joe Biden received 59.9% of the vote (5,162 cast), ahead of Republican Donald Trump with 38.5% (3,320), and other candidates with 1.6% among the 8,798 ballots cast by the borough's 11,661 voters, for a turnout of 75.4%. In the 2016 presidential election, Democrat Hillary Clinton received 56.3% of the vote (4,135 cast), ahead of Republican Donald Trump with 37.8% (2,779 votes), and other candidates with 5.9% among the 7,347 ballots cast by the borough's 11,512 registered voters, for a turnout of 63.8%. In the 2012 presidential election, Democrat Barack Obama received 63.7% of the vote (4,578 cast), ahead of Republican Mitt Romney with 34.6% (2,485 votes), and other candidates with 1.8% (128 votes), among the 7,252 ballots cast by the borough's 10,804 registered voters (61 ballots were spoiled), for a turnout of 67.1%. In the 2008 presidential election, Democrat Barack Obama received 62.8% of the vote (4,516 cast), ahead of Republican John McCain with 35.4% (2,547 votes) and other candidates with 0.9% (62 votes), among the 7,195 ballots cast by the borough's 10,312 registered voters, for a turnout of 69.8%. In the 2004 presidential election, Democrat John Kerry received 58.5% of the vote (3,930 ballots cast), outpolling Republican George W. Bush with 40.1% (2,699 votes) and other candidates with 0.6% (60 votes), among the 6,723 ballots cast by the borough's 9,801 registered voters, for a turnout percentage of 68.6.

In the 2013 gubernatorial election, Republican Chris Christie received 53.0% of the vote (2,106 cast), ahead of Democrat Barbara Buono with 45.0% (1,786 votes), and other candidates with 2.0% (80 votes), among the 4,074 ballots cast by the borough's 10,838 registered voters (102 ballots were spoiled), for a turnout of 37.6%. In the 2009 gubernatorial election, Democrat Jon Corzine received 51.7% of the vote (2,198 ballots cast), ahead of Republican Chris Christie with 39.0% (1,659 votes), Independent Chris Daggett with 6.7% (287 votes) and other candidates with 0.7% (29 votes), among the 4,255 ballots cast by the borough's 9,958 registered voters, yielding a 42.7% turnout.

Education

The Glassboro Public Schools serve students in pre-kindergarten through twelfth grade. As of the 2020–21 school year, the district, comprised of five schools, had an enrollment of 1,848 students and 177.7 classroom teachers (on an FTE basis), for a student–teacher ratio of 10.4:1. Schools in the district (with 2020–21 enrollment data from the National Center for Education Statistics) are 
J. Harvey Rodgers School with 199 students in grades PreK and kindergarten, Dorothy L. Bullock School with 373 students in grades 1-3, Thomas E. Bowe Elementary School with 408 students in grades 4-6, Glassboro Intermediate School with 292 students in grades 7-8, and Glassboro High School with 539 students in grades 9-12.

Students in Gloucester County are eligible to apply to attend Gloucester County Institute of Technology, a four-year high school in Deptford Township that provides technical and vocational education. As a public school, students do not pay tuition to attend the school.

Guardian Angels Regional School is a K-8 school that operates under the auspices of the Roman Catholic Diocese of Camden and accepts students from Glassboro. Its PreK-3 campus is in Gibbstown while its 4-8 campus is in Paulsboro. Our Lady of Lourdes in Glassboro is one of the sending parishes; the former St. Bridget Regional School in Glassboro merged into St. Michael in 2008.

Rowan University is a public university with an enrollment of 19,500 undergraduate and graduate students in 2018–2019. The university was founded in 1923 as Glassboro Normal School on a  site donated by the borough. The school became New Jersey State Teachers College at Glassboro in 1937 and Glassboro State College in 1958. Beginning in the 1970s, the university expanded into a multi-purpose institution, adding programs in business, communications, and engineering. Rowan Boulevard is a mixed-use development intended to provide a vibrant downtown district for Glassboro, incorporating university student life into its design as part of an effort to accommodate a student body that has been projected to grow to about 25,000 in 2023.

Transportation

Roads and highways

Glassboro is crisscrossed by a number of major roads. These include County Route 553, Route 47 and Route 55 (limited access) travel north–south, while U.S. Route 322 (much of which is also Mullica Hill Road) passes through east–west.

Public transportation
NJ Transit provides bus service to and from Philadelphia on the 313, 408 and 412 routes. The Pureland East-West Community Shuttle connects the Pureland Industrial Complex and the Avandale Park and Ride.

Passenger train service to Glassboro was available from 1860 to 1971. The Glassboro station used by the Pennsylvania-Reading Seashore Lines is being renovated as a visitor center. A new station at Rowan University in the vicinity of the historic depot is the planned for the proposed Glassboro–Camden Line, an  diesel multiple unit (DMU) light rail system. The terminal station would be one stop further at Main and High streets.

Walking and cycling 
Walking is a popular form of transportation especially around the university where many underclassmen are not permitted to have cars.

The trail traverses the Glassboro State Wildlife Refuge before terminating at Delsea Drive. Future work will extend this trail along former railroad right of way from Delsea Drive to Rowan U's Bunce Hall. Path links to Elmer and Pitman are also proposed.

Notable people 

People who were born in, residents of, or otherwise closely associated with Glassboro include:
 John Aveni (1935–2002), kicker for the Chicago Bears
 Gary Brackett (born 1980), linebacker on the Super Bowl XLI champion Indianapolis Colts
 Mark Lambert Bristol (1868–1939), rear admiral in the United States Navy
 King Kong Bundy (1957–2019), professional wrestler, stand-up comedian and actor
 Mary Carnell (1861–1925), photographer
 Betty Castor (born 1941), Florida Senate Candidate and former President of The University of South Florida
 Corey Clement (born 1994), running back for the Super Bowl LII champion Philadelphia Eagles
 Joe Crispin (born 1979), former NBA player for the Phoenix Suns and Los Angeles Lakers
 Daniel Dalton (born 1949), politician who served as New Jersey Senate Majority Leader and as Secretary of State of New Jersey
 Sean F. Dalton (born 1962), Prosecutor of Gloucester County, New Jersey who previously served two terms in the New Jersey General Assembly, where he represented the 4th Legislative District
 Thomas M. Ferrell (1844–1916), represented New Jersey's 1st congressional district in the United States House of Representatives from 1883 to 1885
 Cathe Friedrich (born 1964), athlete, instructor and innovator in the fitness video industry
 Kerry Getz (born 1975), professional skateboarder
 Jaden (born 1977), professional wrestling manager and commentator
 George Johnson (born 1987), defensive end for the Detroit Lions of the National Football League
 Juwan Johnson (born 1996), American football wide receiver for the New Orleans Saints of the National Football League
 Jarvis Lynch (born 1933), retired major general in the United States Marine Corps
 Oscar Moore (born 1938), long-distance runner who competed in the men's 5000 meters at the 1964 Summer Olympics
 Thomas J. Osler (born 1940), mathematician, former national champion distance runner and author
 Brian Oliver (born 1990), professional basketball player
 George H. Stanger (1902–1958), politician who served in the New Jersey Senate from 1938 to 1946

See also

References

External links

 Glassboro official website

 
1878 establishments in New Jersey
Borough form of New Jersey government
Boroughs in Gloucester County, New Jersey
Populated places established in 1878